is a Japanese football player. He plays for Kyoto Sanga FC.

Career
Temma Matsuda joined J2 League club Shonan Bellmare in 2017. After being promoted to J1 League for the 2018 season, he scored his first goal as an equalizer against Kawasaki Frontale for an eventual 1-1 draw.

Club statistics
Updated to 18 February 2019.

References

External links
Profile at Shonan Bellmare

1995 births
Living people
National Institute of Fitness and Sports in Kanoya alumni
Association football people from Kumamoto Prefecture
Japanese footballers
J1 League players
J2 League players
Shonan Bellmare players
Kyoto Sanga FC players
Association football midfielders